Epidendrum cornutum is the accepted name for a species of Epidendrum native to Colombia, Ecuador, Peru, and Venezuela at altitudes of 2.4–3 km.

The stem of this epiphyte is covered by close, tubular sheathes which bear bamboo-like (lnarrow, linear-lanceolate, very acute, with a cuneate sessile base) leaves on the upper part of the stem.  The foot-long terminal inflorescence emerges from 1—3 large sheathes which completely cover the peduncle, and ends in a densely flowered raceme of fragrant, fleshy, flowers with filiform petals and a deeply three-lobed lip with slightly denticulate margins.  The flower color can be white, light yellow, light green, or tan.

Homonymy 
The identity of this taxon has been confused by the publication, in 1894, of a description of Stanhopea oculata (first described in 1832) under the name Epidendrum cornutum.

References

External links 

cornutum
Orchids of Colombia
Orchids of Ecuador
Orchids of Peru
Orchids of Venezuela